Shaun Pendleton, born in Sheffield, England, was an English-American soccer defender who played four seasons in the American Indoor Soccer Association before becoming a college soccer coach.  His teams won the 1991 NAIA and 2003 NCAA Division II soccer championships.

Player
Pendleton grew up in Sheffield, England.  In 1982, he entered the University of Akron, playing for the men’s soccer team until 1985.  He was a 1984 and 1985 first team All American.  He graduated in 1986 with a bachelor's degree in physical education.  The Zips inducted him into the school’s Hall of Fame in 2004.  In 1985, Pendleton signed with the Columbus Capitals of the American Indoor Soccer Association (AISA).  The Capitals folded at the end of the 1985–1986 season.  He then moved to the Memphis Storm for three seasons before retiring from playing professionally.

Coach
In 1989, NCAA Division II University of Charleston hired Pendleton as its head coach.  In his two seasons as head coach he, took the Golden Eagles to a 27–11–1 record.  In 1991, he moved to Lynn University which played in the NAIA.  Over seventeen seasons, he compiled a 293–42–12 record.  He took the Fighting Knights to the 1991 NAIA national men's soccer championship, then runner up in 1992 and 1993.  In 1995, Lynn University moved to the NCAA Division II, winning the 2003 championship.  In 2008, Appalachian State University hired Pendleton as head coach.

Pendleton was found dead at his home on September 7, 2011.

References

1961 births
2011 deaths
Footballers from Sheffield
All-American men's college soccer players
American soccer coaches
American soccer players
Akron Zips men's soccer players
American Indoor Soccer Association players
Columbus Capitals players
Memphis Storm players
Appalachian State Mountaineers men's soccer coaches
Association football defenders
Charleston Golden Eagles men's soccer coaches
Lynn Fighting Knights men's soccer coaches